Peveril Peak is a  mountain summit located in Alberta, Canada.

Description
Peveril Peak is set within Jasper National Park, in the Trident Range of the Canadian Rockies. The nearest higher neighbor is Terminal Mountain,  to the north. The peak is visible from the Icefields Parkway to the east. Precipitation runoff from Peveril Peak drains into Portal Creek, a tributary of the Athabasca River. Topographic relief is significant as the summit rises 850 meters (2,790 feet) above the creek in one kilometer (0.6 mile).

History

The summit was first reached in 1926 by Bradley B. Gilman and his crew, who called it "Portal Peak." The peak was named in 1932 after Sir Walter Scott's 1823 novel Peveril of the Peak, and in turn the title refers to Peveril Castle. The mountain's toponym was officially adopted February 7, 1951, by the Geographical Names Board of Canada.

Climate

Based on the Köppen climate classification, Peveril Peak is located in a subarctic climate zone with cold, snowy winters, and mild summers. Winter temperatures can drop below -20 °C with wind chill factors below -30 °C.

Geology

The mountain is composed of sedimentary rock laid down during the Precambrian to Jurassic periods and pushed east and over the top of younger rock during the Laramide orogeny.

See also
 
 Geography of Alberta

Gallery

References

External links
 Parks Canada web site: Jasper National Park
 Peveril Peak: weather forecast
 Climbing Peveril Peak: Giantsgate.com
 Bradley Baldwin Gilman in memoriam: Americanalpineclub.org

Two-thousanders of Alberta
Mountains of Jasper National Park
Canadian Rockies
Alberta's Rockies